Daniel Harris (born 31 December 1979) is an Australian former cricketer who played for South Australia, Adelaide Strikers, Melbourne Renegades and the Deccan Chargers.

Harris retired from professional cricket in 2014 to become a full-time doctor.

Playing career
He is a regular player for South Australia in all 3 forms of the game and played a pivotal role in helping the Redbacks win the 2010–11 KFC Twenty20 Big Bash. His outstanding season was rewarded by being named the Australian Cricketers Association's Twenty20 Player of the Year.

Harris was picked up by Deccan Chargers to play in Indian Premier League during the 2012 IPL player auction.

He also signed with the Melbourne Renegades for the second season of the Big Bash League in 2012.

Harris has played as a substitute for the Australian Test Squad.

Personal life
Harris is a qualified medical doctor.

References

1979 births
Living people
Australian medical doctors
Cricketers from Adelaide
Australian cricketers
Adelaide Strikers cricketers
Deccan Chargers cricketers
Khulna Tigers cricketers
Melbourne Renegades cricketers
Northern Districts cricketers
Ruhuna Royals cricketers
South Australia cricketers